Shōjū-in (正住院) is a Buddhist temple of the Jōdo-shū, located in Tokoname, Aichi Prefecture, central Japan.

References

External links 

Buddhist temples in Aichi Prefecture